was a Japanese noble of the Nara period. Born the seventh son of the chūnagon Nakatomi no Omimaro of the Nakatomi clan, he changed his name and founded the Ōnakatomi clan.

Life 
In 747, in the last days of the court of Emperor Shōmu, he was moved to a regional position as governor of Owari Province.

Under the administration of Fujiwara no Nakamaro, Kiyomaro advanced steadily.

Later that year, though, Nakamaro rebelled, and Kiyomaro supported the Empress Kōken's side against him. In the next year, 765, he was further awarded honors, second class, for his service. At the banquet after Kōken's re-enthronement ceremony as Empress Shōtoku, Kiyomaro was in attendance as director of the Jingi-kan.

Kiyomaro continued his rise in the courts of both Empress Shōtoku and Emperor Kōnin. In 768 he was promoted to chūnagon, and in 769 he changed his family name from Nakatomi no Ason to Ōnakatomi no Ason. In 773, he was re-appointed as tutor to the new Crown Prince Yamabe, the future Emperor Kanmu.

In his role as udaijin, Kiyomaro headed the Daijō-kan until 780.

In 781, immediately following the ascension of Emperor Kanmu, Kiyomaro was allowed to retire at the age of 70. He died in 788, at the age of 87.

Personality 
As an old retainer familiar with the past days of the court, Kiyomaro memorized and was proficient in many court ceremonies. Even as he aged, he was diligent and never shirked his official duties.

Five of his poems are recorded in the Man'yōshū.

Genealogy 
Father: 
Mother: , daughter of 
Wife: ,  and 
Fourth son: 
Other children: 
First son: 
Second son: 
Third son: 
Son: 
Son: 
Daughter: wife of

Notes

References 

702 births
788 deaths
People of Nara-period Japan